The tour of the Bangladesh team to Kenya, during February, 1984, was the first visit of Bangladesh to any associate member country. The tour started a rivalry (between Bangladesh & Kenya cricket teams) which became very intense in the 1990s. On this tour, Bangladesh drew the only 3-Day fixture, won a 2-day (over restricted) match, but won only 1 of the 5 limited over matches(That too against the Combined School XI). Overall, it was a disappointing tour for the Bangladesh side.

The Bangladesh team

The tour followed immediately after the South East Asian Cricket cup in Bangladesh. Apart from the Bangladesh National team (which won the cup), The Bangladesh Tigers (The unofficial 'A' team, consisting mostly of youngsters) had participated in that cup. Players like, Rafiqul Alam. Minhajul Abedin Nannu, Hafizur Rahman & Wahidul Gani, having done well for the tigers were included in the team for Kenya tour. The team had a nice balance of youth and experience, yet during the tour, they failed to perform up to expectations, mainly due to disunity among the players. There was conflict of interests between the younger and older members of the side.

Scores in brief

Bangladesh performance

Despite the poor performance of the side Assaduzzaman Misha emerged as a bright light during the tour. Considered as not suitable for limited over game, he was not picked for the first two one-day matches. Given his chance in the 2 Day match, he scored 33 and 36. But his best came in the 3-Day match against the Kenya national XI. After the hosts posted a 300+ score, Misha led a spirited Bangladesh reply. He top scored with 68 & put on 73 with Minhajul Abedin for the 1st wicket, and 71 with Gazi Ashraf for the 2nd. Surprisingly, despite this performance Misha was dropped for the One-Day Match against Kenya Cricket Association. He returned to the team for the last two matches and scored 47 & 23 (top score for his side on each occasion). Following the retirement of Yousuf Rahman, at the end of the season, Misha was the undisputed No. 1 opener of the country. Unfortunately, like many others of his generation, he gave greater importance to his professional career (he was a doctor by profession). Thus, he was very rarely available for national team duty after 1985.

Lipu did well in the 2 Day and 3 Day matches. but failed in the One-Day matches. With, regular opener Yousuf Babu struggling for form, Nehal Hasnain & Minhajul Abedin Nannu were tried in the opening slot.

Yousuf Rahman failed with the bat, but rather unexpectedly, he emerged as his team's most effective bowler. Badshah put on a big effort in the 3 Day match and won admiration from the opponents. Lipu and Misha did a good job as part-time spinners, but the main spin bowler Wahidul Gani was very disappointing.

Top batsman and bowler

A bitter rivalry

This tour started a bitter rivalry between two of the more stronger associate member nations. During the next decade or so, they met each other regularly in different ICC Trophy tournaments.

In 1986, both the teams performed very poorly in the tournament. But, in 1990, both the teams reached SF with Bangladeshfinishing 3rd, and Kenya 4th. They met in a vital match in the 94 ICC trophy. After their defeat at the hands of the Netherlands, it was a do or die match for Bangladesh. A narrow defeat saw them miss their chance of a WC place. Kenya eventually finished runners up (Behind UAE) and qualified for the 1996 WC in the Indian subcontinent. In !997, the two teams met in a thrilling final. With both sides already assured of WC places only pride was at stake. Bangladesh snatched a last ball victory to lift the Trophy. In July, 1997, both the nations were granted permission to play full ODIs and thus were guaranteed a place in the future WCs, so the saga of ICC Trophy ended there.

The only meeting between the two nations in WC cricket came at Johannesburg, South Africa, in 2003. Kenya won this match and eventually went onto reach the Semi-Finals. The old nemesis, Maurice Odumbe came back to haunt the Bangladeshi players again, with a superb all-round performance. This, however, is Kenya's last ODI win (Until July 2009), over Bangladesh. Bangladesh has dominated the recent matches.

Bangladesh vs Kenya: head to head in ODIs

The first full ODI between the 2 teams took place at Nairobi, in Oct. 1997, and resulted in a crushing victory for the hosts. Chudasama (122) & Kennedy Otieno (144) put on 225 for the first wicket, as the hosts rattled a huge total of 347/3 from their 50 overs. In reply, Bangladesh could only master 197. Bangladesh achieved their first ever ODI win, when they beat Kenya at Hyderabad(India)in 1998. Chasing 237 for victory, Bangladesh reached their target thanks mainly to Mohammad Rafique, who scored 77. Bangladesh's next victory over Kenya didn't come before 2006. But, since then, Bangladesh, now a full member of ICC, has totally dominated the rivalry.

Co-operation between the rivals
Despite the intense rivalry between the two countries, there is also considerable cooperation as well. In early 1995, Kenya toured Bangladesh. Though, they lost most of the games, this tour gave them the opportunity to gain valuable experience about South Asian pitches and conditions. This experience helped them in their WC performance a year later. With the Bangladesh side going through some changes, following the disastrous ICC Trophy, a year earlier, this tour provided the local selectors the chance to try some youngsters.

Kenya's two most famous cricketers, Maurice Odumbe & Steve Tikolo have played club cricket at Dhaka, with great distinction.

References

1983 in cricket
1984 in cricket
1983 in Kenya
1984 in Kenya
1983-84
International cricket competitions from 1980–81 to 1985
Kenyan cricket seasons to 1999–2000
1983 in Bangladeshi cricket
1984 in Bangladeshi cricket
1984 in Kenyan cricket